CLaCS (Cryo-Laser and Cryo-Sclerotherapy) is a treatment for leg vein lesions by combining transdermal laser effect and injection sclerotherapy, all under skin cooling (Cryo - cold air blown onto the skin at -20C).State of the art on cryo-laser cryo-sclerotherapy in lower limb venous aesthetic treatment The laser causes a selective photothermolysis damaging the vein wall. The vein's lumen gets smaller. On a second procedure, sclerosing agent is injected where the vein is still open. This combination allows to treat veins that could be treated by phlebotomy or foam sclerotherapy - more invasive options. To improve results, CLaCS can be guided by Augmented Reality (near-infrared vein finder).

CLaCS was created by Dr. Roberto Kasuo Miyake, in 2002, to adhere to patients' requests for treatment that did not require hospitalizations.

References

Medical treatments